"In My Arms" is the lead single from Plumb's lullaby album Blink. "In My Arms" was remixed by Kaskade, Scotty K, Bronleewe & Bose, Gomi, and Bimbo Jones and hit the No. 1 spot on the Billboard Hot Dance Club Songs. The song was the 19th most played song on Christian Hit Radio stations in the U.S. in 2007 according to R&R magazine. It was also on the top of the Billboard Hot Dance Airplay chart and is the first song to appear on both charts. The single was released digitally.

The song was also used on the CW's One Tree Hill.

Track listing
Digital Single
"In My Arms" - 4:03

Remix Single
"In My Arms" (Bronleewe & Bose Radio Edit) - 4:02
"In My Arms" (Bimbo Jones Radio Edit) - 3:43
"In My Arms" (Scotty K Radio Edit) - 4:46
"In My Arms" (Gomi Radio Edit) - 4:48
"In My Arms" (Bronleewe & Bose Extended Mix) - 7:36
"In My Arms" (Bimbo Jones Extended Mix) - 7:36
"In My Arms" (Scotty K Extended Klub Mix) - 9:15
"In My Arms" (Gomi Extended Mix) - 8:31

Kaskade Mixes
"In My Arms" (Kaskade Extended Mix) - 7:07
"In My Arms" (Kaskade Radio Edit) - 3:40

Chart performance

Weekly charts

Year-end charts

References

2007 singles
Plumb (singer) songs
2006 songs
Curb Records singles
Songs written by Matt Bronleewe